Rúben Miguel Carvalho Marques (born 17 October 1994 in Camarate - Loures) is a Portuguese footballer  who plays for Real S.C., as a midfielder.

Football career
On 29 July 2017, Marques made his professional debut with Real in a 2017–18 Taça da Liga match against Belenenses.

References

External links

Portuguese League profile 

1994 births
Living people
Portuguese footballers
Association football midfielders